Noelina Kisembo Basemera (born 27 December 1973) is a Ugandan politician, legislator and an administrator.

Background 
Noelina Kisembo Basemera was born on 27 December 1973. She is a Ugandan politician, legislator and an administrator by profession. She is the Kibaale District woman member of parliament  and a  member of the National Resistance Movement(NRM) party, the party in political leadership in Uganda under the chairmanship of Yoweri Kaguta Museveni president of the republic of Uganda.

Education 
Kisembo started her primary education at muhorro primary school Kibale and completed her primary leaving examinations in 1987, she enrolled at Naigana secondary school for her O'level education and completed her Uganda Certificate of Education(UCE) in 1991, she thereafter joined st Andrea Kaahwas college hoima for her A'level education where she completed her Uganda Advanced Certificate of Education(UACE) in 1994. She later joined Makerere University and graduated with a bachelor's degree in Social sciences in 1998 and later added master's degree in development studies in 2008

Career 
Kisembo has been Kibale woman member of parliament from 2016 to date.

She worked with Uganda Kolping society as deputy executive director from 2003 to 2016, education coordinator from 1999 to 2003 and assistant education Coordinator from 1996 to 1999.

In parliament she serves on the committee on east African community affairs. She is also a member of the Uganda Woman Parliamentary Association (UWOPA).

References 

Living people
Members of the Parliament of Uganda
1973 births
People from Kibaale District
Women members of the Parliament of Uganda
National Resistance Movement politicians
21st-century Ugandan politicians
21st-century Ugandan women politicians